This is a list of notable British people with German ancestry.

Academia
 Ralf Dahrendorf, sociologist, philosopher, political scientist and liberal politician; born in Hamburg, he acquired British citizenship in 1988
 Geoffrey Elton, born Gottfried Rudolf Otto Ehrenberg), historian specialising in the Tudor period, born in Tübingen, moved to Britain in 1939
 Edgar Feuchtwanger, historian and author
 Timothy Reuter, historian of medieval Europe whose father was born in Germany
 John Stein, professor of physiology and fellow of Magdalen College, Oxford; brother of the chef Rick Stein
 J. R. R. Tolkien, writer, poet, philologist, linguist and professor of Anglo-Saxon; his family had German roots but had been living in England since the 18th century; "Tolkien" derives from the German "tollkühn", meaning "foolhardy"
 Sir Guenter Treitel, academic lawyer and expert in English contract law

Aristocracy and royalty
The Astor family, originally from Walldorf but gained prominence in both America and England; the English branch holds two hereditary peerages: Viscount Astor and Baron Astor
 The British Royal Family, who belong to the House of Windsor (a branch of the House of Saxe-Coburg and Gotha); George V of the United Kingdom changed the name of his branch from Saxe-Coburg and Gotha to Windsor in 1917; through Queen Victoria, the current royal family are also descended from the House of Hanover (see entry below)
 Queen Mary of Teck, consort of George V; born in Kensington Palace, London, she was a member of the House of Württemberg (through her father Francis, Duke of Teck) and also a descendant of the House of Hanover (through her mother Princess Mary Adelaide of Cambridge)
 Prince Philip, Duke of Edinburgh, member of the British Royal Family by marriage (consort of Elizabeth II), and member of the House of Schleswig-Holstein-Sonderburg-Glücksburg by birth
 John Dalberg-Acton, 1st Baron Acton, referred to simply as Lord Acton, Catholic historian, politician and writer, whose mother was a scion of the noble German Dalberg family
 Lady Mary Victoria Douglas-Hamilton (later Hereditary Princess of Monaco), whose mother was a member of the House of Baden
 Natalia Grosvenor, Duchess of Westminster, wife of Gerald Grosvenor, 6th Duke of Westminster, and great-granddaughter of Julius Wernher
 The House of Hanover, German royal dynasty who produced seven British monarchs: George I, George II, George III, George IV, William IV and Victoria
 Harold Augustus Wernher, 3rd Baronet, peer, grandfather of the above Natalia Grosvenor (née Phillips) and son of Julius Wernher. The Mountbatten family also has German origin.

Art
 Frank Auerbach, artist
 Lucian Freud, German-born painter
 Walter Sickert, Munich-born painter of Danish-German, English and Irish descent (son of the painter Oswald Sickert)

Commerce
 Siegfried Bettmann, founder of motorcycle maker Triumph Engineering and car maker Triumph Motor Company, descended from the village of Bettmannsäge
 Charles Beyer, born Carl Friedrich Beyer, co-founder of railway locomotive builder Beyer, Peacock & Company
 Henry Bolckow, co-founder of steelmaker Bolckow, Vaughan and Liberal politician
 Ernest Cassel, merchant banker of Ashkenazi Jewish descent, born in Cologne
 Henry Dübs, born Heinrich Dübs, founder of railway locomotive builder Dübs & Company
 John Goodman, born Johannes Gütgemann, founder of motorcycle maker Velocette
 Tiny Rowland, originally Roland Walter Fuhrhop, Rhodesian-British chairman of the Lonrho conglomerate 1962–94
 Gustav Wilhelm Wolff, co-founder of shipbuilder Harland & Wolff, Conservative MP

Entertainment
 Simon Callow, actor of English, Danish, German and French descent
 Julian Clary, comedian with a great-grandfather (on his father's side) and a great-grandmother (on his mother's side) who were born in Germany
 Sacha Baron Cohen, actor, comedian, Israeli mother born to German Jewish parents
 Ernest Cossart, actor born as Emil von Holst; brother of the composer Gustav Holst and consequently of German, Swedish, British, Latvian and Spanish descent
 Rupert Everett, actor whose great-great-grandmother, Augusta Clara de Schmiedern, was a scion of the aristocratic Schmiedern family (Barons von Schmeidern)
 Richard E. Grant, actor of Dutch-Afrikaner, Hungarian and half-German descent
 Jenny Hanley, actress of English descent through her father, Jimmy Hanley, and Russian-Jewish and German descent through her mother Dinah Sheridan
Gerard Hoffnung, Jewish-German musical humourist, born in Berlin who arrived in Britain as a Kindertransport refugee. 
 Derek Jacobi, actor and film director, whose great-grandfather, William Jacobi emigrated from Germany to England in the 19th century
 Frederick Jaeger, actor
 Jodhi May, actress of French-Turkish Jewish and German descent
 Robert Morley, actor whose mother, Gertrude Emily (née Fass), came from a German family that had emigrated to South Africa
 Olivia Newton-John, actress and singer, matrilineal granddaughter of Max Born; her mother and maternal grandparents were Jewish German 
 Soni Razdan, Bollywood actress
 Carol Reed, film director and illegitimate son of Herbert Beerbohm Tree
 Oliver Reed, actor who had Dutch, Lithuanian and German ancestry through his grandfather Herbert Beerbohm Tree
 Enn Reitel, actor and impressionist; his family arrived as refugees from Estonia and Germany
 Sean Pertwee, actor; son of actor Jon Pertwee and his German wife, Ingeborg (née Rhoesa)
 Mark Sheppard, actor and musician, born in London of an Irish and German background
 Dinah Sheridan, actress of Russian-Jewish and German descent
 Claire Stansfield, actress, director, fashion designer and model of half-English and half-German descent
 Herbert Beerbohm Tree, actor and theatre manager who was born as Herbert Draper Beerbohm, son of Julius Beerbohm; his father was of Dutch, Lithuanian and German origin
 Iris Tree, actress, poet and artists' model; daughter of Herbert Beerbohm Tree
 Viola Tree, actress; daughter of Herbert Beerbohm Tree
 Peter Ustinov, actor, writer and dramatist of Russian, German, Polish-Jewish and Ethiopian noble descent
 Gordon Warnecke, actor of Indo-Guyanese and German descent

Food
 Rick Stein, chef, restaurateur and television presenter whose father, Eric Stein, was of German descent (an ancestor, Julius Otto Stein, emigrated from Germany in the 19th century)

Literature
 Sybille Bedford, novelist born in Charlottenburg
 John Berger, art critic and novelist, grandfather from Trieste
 Max Beerbohm, essayist, novelist and caricaturist who was of German descent by virtue of his relationship to Herbert Beerbohm Tree, his half-brother; their father was Julius Beerbohm
 Ford Madox Ford, novelist whose father, Francis Hueffer, was from Germany
 Robert Graves (full name Robert von Ranke Graves), poet, novelist and scholar, whose German mother was a great-niece of the historian Leopold von Ranke
 Adam Hart-Davis, historian, photographer, television presenter and scientist; son of Rupert Hart-Davis
 Duff Hart-Davis, biographer and journalist, son of Rupert Hart-Davis
 Rupert Hart-Davis, man of letters, publisher and editor; great-great-great grandson of King William IV and, in turn, the German House of Hanover (and other prominent German dynasties)
 Frieda Hughes, poet and painter; daughter of Ted Hughes and Sylvia Plath; Sylvia's father, Otto Plath, was German while her mother, Aurelia Plath, was of Austrian descent
 Judith Kerr, author of children's books, born in Berlin
 John Lehmann, man of letters and editor, whose Hamburg-born grandfather, Augustus Frederick Lehmann, was a businessman and Liberal politician
 Patrick O'Brian (born Richard Patrick Russ), novelist and translator, the son of a physician of German descent
 Sir Nikolaus Pevsner, historian of art and architecture
 Stephen Spender, poet and novelist, whose mother (Violet Hilda Schuster) had German parents
 J. R. R. Tolkien, writer, poet, philologist, linguist and Professor of Anglo-Saxon (also see above entry in 'Academia')

Music
 Antony Beaumont, musicologist, writer, composer and conductor; born in London of Anglo-German and Greek-Romanian heritage
 David Bedford, composer and musician; brother of Steuart Bedford (below) and grandson of Liza Lehmann
 Steuart Bedford, conductor and pianist; brother of the above David Bedford and grandson of Liza Lehmann
 Justin Broadrick, musician known primarily for Godflesh and Jesu; maternal grandparents were German immigrants.
 Frederick Delius, composer born as Fritz Theodore Albert Delius in Bradford, Yorkshire to German parents
 Gustav Holst, composer of British, Swedish, Spanish, Latvian and German descent
 Bert Jansch, folk musician and descendant of a family originally from Hamburg, who had settled in Scotland during the Victorian era

News and journalism
 Rachel Johnson, editor, journalist, television presenter and writer; sister of Boris and Jo Johnson, and descendant of the House of Württemberg through an illegitimate line
 Laura Kuenssberg, journalist; granddaughter of Ekkehard von Kuenssberg

Politics and government
 David Cameron, Conservative Party politician and former Prime Minister, who is descended from the German House of Hanover through his fourth great-grandmother Elizabeth Hay, Countess of Erroll, illegitimate daughter of King William IV
 Alf Dubs, Baron Dubs, Labour Party politician
 Eyre Crowe, former diplomat whose mother, Asta von Barby, was a German noblewoman
 Natascha Engel, Labour Party politician and Member of Parliament (half-German and half-English descent, born in Berlin)
 Nigel Farage, UKIP politician, whose great-grandfather Charles Justus Schrod (born Carl Julius Schrod), was born to German parents
 Anthony Gueterbock, 18th Baron Berkeley, Labour Party peer
Wera Hobhouse, ( née von Reden) Liberal Democrat and Member of Parliament for Bath
Boris Johnson, Conservative Party politician and former Prime Minister of the United Kingdom who is descended from the royal German House of Württemberg (and the House of Hanover) through his German great-great-great grandmother Karolina von Rothenburg (born to Prince Paul of Württemberg and his mistress Frederike Porth)
 Jo Johnson, Conservative Party politician and Member of Parliament; brother of Boris and Rachel Johnson, and descendant of the House of Württemberg through an illegitimate line
 Joseph Jonas, former Mayor of Sheffield and Imperial German Consul to the city
 William Joyce
 Angus Robertson, SNP politician and Member of Parliament; born to a Scottish father and German mother
 Alexander Stafford, Conservative Party politician, Member of Parliament for Rother Valley
 Gisela Stuart (born Gisela Gschaider), Labour Party politician and Member of Parliament

Science
 Andre Geim, Russian-born Dutch-British physicist working in the School of Physics and Astronomy at the University of Manchester 
 John Herschel, English mathematician, astronomer, chemist and inventor; son of William Herschel, the Hanover-born astronomer who emigrated to Great Britain at the age of nineteen
 William Herschel, 2nd Baronet, forensic scientist; son of the above John Herschel and grandson of William Herschel
 Frederick Lindemann, scientific adviser and physicist; son of Adolph Friedrich Lindemann, an engineer born in the Palatinate
 Otto Metzger, German-British engineer, and inventor of an impact-extrusion process for forming seamless zinc and brass cans

Sport
 Nicky Butt, former English international footballer
 Geoff Hurst, former English international footballer; his mother, Evelyn Blick, was from Gloucestershire but her family originally came from Germany
 Daniel Prenn (1904–1991), Russian-born German, Polish, and British world-top-ten tennis player
 Glenn Roeder, former English Club football coach
 Jimmy Bullard, former English footballer

Other
 William Stuart-Houston, nephew of Adolf Hitler

See also
 British people
 German migration to the United Kingdom
 German people

References

 
German
German